Mohamad Orungi (born 26 November 1962) is a Kenyan boxer. He competed in the men's light middleweight event at the 1988 Summer Olympics.

References

1962 births
Living people
Kenyan male boxers
Olympic boxers of Kenya
Boxers at the 1988 Summer Olympics
African Games gold medalists for Kenya
African Games medalists in boxing
Place of birth missing (living people)
Competitors at the 1987 All-Africa Games
Light-middleweight boxers